The Nessler ball -- or balle Nessler -- is a type of muzzle-loading musket bullet. It was developed to increase the accuracy and range of smoothbore muskets and was used in the Crimean War.  It featured a short conical-cylindrical soft lead bullet, with a conical hollow in its base. The bullet was designed with a lead skirting. Its intended purpose was to expand under the pressure and obturate the barrel and increase muzzle velocity.  The bullet could be quickly removed from a paper cartridge with the gunpowder poured down the barrel and the bullet pressed past the muzzle. It was then rammed home with the ramrod, which ensured that the charge was packed and the hollow base was filled with powder. When fired, the expanding gas pushed forcibly on the base of the bullet, deforming it to form a better seal for consistent velocity, longer range, and accuracy. A similar ball design called the Chace ball (after its inventor W.B. Chace) was developed in 1861 in the United States but was not adopted.

See also
Minié ball

Notes

References

External links 
http://www.civilwarguns.com/9910b.html
http://www.littlegun.info/arme%20francaise/collection%20fusils/a%20a%20coll%20fusil%20evolution%20projectiles%20gb.htm

Bullets